Mulegé Airstrip or Mulegé Municipal Airstrip  is a public dirt airstrip located  northeast of the town of Mulegé, in the Municipality of Mulegé, Baja California Sur state, northwest Mexico.

It is on the north bank of the Mulegé River,  from the Gulf of California coast.

The airstrip is used solely for general aviation purposes. It is a secondary airport to the El Gallito Airstrip, which is the most used, due to better quality installations and safety conditions.

External links
 MMMG Airport.
 MUG at Flightstats.
 MUG at World Airport Codes.
 Mulegé Municipal Photo.

Airports in Baja California Sur
Mulegé Municipality